Adair Rae Tishler (born October 3, 1996) is an American former child actress, model, voice actress, and singer, who has appeared in television shows such as Charmed and House and in movies such as Within and An American Girl: Chrissa Stands Strong. She is also known for portraying Molly Walker on NBC's Heroes.

Career

Tishler has participated in theater productions of Cinderella and Sound of Music. Her résumé includes voice-over work, and she has also performed in music videos—she appears in Martina McBride's video God's Will and in Rhonda Vincent's video If Heartaches Had Wings which also featured pop-star and actress Miley Cyrus.

Her other performances include the role of Carrie in the short indie film Six and the City, a knock-off of the hit TV show Sex and the City. Tishler has also appeared in the hit WB series Charmed in its final season. She portrayed Tara James in the American Girl movie Chrissa Stands Strong.

Adair used to sing lead vocals for the indie rock band Smash It Up. Tishler sang with four of her middle school friends from Burbank, California: Cole Clarke (lead guitar), Brennan Flynn (bass guitar), Mia Viesca (drums). The band released a self-titled CD of original songs on April 21, 2009.

Adair has also been involved with modeling in fashion shows and has been hired multiple times for photo shoots. Adair once stated that she may sign up for a professional modeling school once she gets more acting jobs. Since moving from Los Angeles, California, a representative of Tishler stated in late 2010 that she will be taking a break from acting and singing for Smash It Up to focus on school and family.

Awards
She won a Young Artist Award in 2008 for Best Performance in a TV Series - Supporting Young Actress for her performance in Heroes.

Filmography

References

External links

1996 births
21st-century American actresses
Actresses from Nashville, Tennessee
Musicians from Nashville, Tennessee
American child actresses
American film actresses
American television actresses
American child singers
Living people
21st-century American singers
21st-century American women singers